Mezhove may refer to several places in Ukraine:

Mezhove, Crimea
Mezhove (urban-type settlement), Donetsk Oblast
Mezhove (village), Donetsk Oblast
Mezhove, Dnipropetrovsk Oblast
Mezhove, Kirovohrad Oblast
Mezhove, Kyiv Oblast